The Copenhagen Tunnel is a set of three parallel railway tunnels carrying the main line tracks out of London's  under the rising ground at Barnsbury, about a mile north of the station. Each bore has the capacity for two tracks. The eastern tunnel was taken out of railway service in the 1970s but is maintained to ensure the integrity of the ground overhead, and provides road vehicle access to Holloway Bank. The tunnel is just over a  third of a mile (543 metres) long.

The first of the multiple tunnels was built as part of the construction of the Great Northern Railway and was opened in 1850. This section of the railway was designed by the engineer Thomas Brassey and was built by Pearce and Smith and John Jay.  The name is taken from Copenhagen Fields, an open space directly above the tunnels, that was once the location of the Ambassador of Denmark's residence in the 17th century. This became a popular pleasure garden and was a public meeting area, notable for rioting there in the late 18th century. From this site on 21 April 1834 thousands marched in support of The Tolpuddle Martyrs who had been sentenced to transportation to Australia for forming a trade union. Market Road Gardens, an open space directly above the tunnels, are a present-day surviving remnant of the Fields.

The area above the southern tunnel portal was used for a rail line going to the Caledonian Road Coal and Goods Depot (now Bunning Street) which passed along the parapet of the tunnel entrance. This was situated conveniently close to the Metropolitan Cattle Market, located on the ground above the tunnels from 1855 to 1963. Many trains carried cattle along this line on their last journey to the abattoirs there.

The area above the southern  parapet was the setting for the final scenes of the 1955 British film comedy, The Ladykillers.

The original tunnel is now the middle of three parallel bores. A second tunnel to the west was built in 1877 and a third one to the east in 1886. The western bore carried up and down goods traffic, the central one was used for down passenger traffic and the eastern bore was used for up passenger traffic.

Following electrification in the 1970s, the layout was remodelled. By this time both Kings Cross Goods Yard and Top Shed had closed so it was possible to remove the goods lines and simplify the layout.

In the current configuration, the lines approaching the tunnel from the north are grouped into Up Fast & Slow and Down Fast & Slow. Immediately before the northern portal the Up Slow is carried over the Up & Down Fast lines by an overbridge to join the Down Slow line so the central bore now carries the Up and Down Fast lines; the western bore carries the Up and Down Slow lines. The tracks in the eastern bore were lifted and it is now used to carry cables and provide occasional road access.

From Belle Isle, just south of Copenhagen Tunnel all four lines become bidirectional before passing through Gasworks Tunnel to King's Cross station.

References

External links
 Various images of the tunnels

Railway tunnels in England
Tunnels completed in 1850
Railway tunnels in London
Rail infrastructure in London